Constance 'Connie' Wheaton (1908-1964), (married name Brigden), was a female international table tennis player from England.

Table tennis career
She represented England as part of the women's team for the 1937 Corbillon Cup (women's world team event). The team consisting of Margaret Osborne, Wendy Woodhead and Doris Jordan finished in fifth place.

She was two times London Championships winner. and reached the last 16 of the women's doubles during the 1935 and 1937 World Championships and the last 16 of the singles in 1935.

Personal life
She married Leslie Brigden in 1941.

See also
 List of England players at the World Team Table Tennis Championships

References 

1908 births
1964 deaths
English female table tennis players
Sportspeople from St Albans